Live at the 100 Club is a live album by The Damned, recorded on 6 July 1976 at London's 100 Club. The album was released in 2007, originally included as a bonus disc with the 30th Anniversary Deluxe version of The Damned's debut album, Damned Damned Damned, and later on vinyl, limited to 1,000 LPs.

The show was the first ever played by The Damned, who were opening for the Sex Pistols. According to Brian James, Sex Pistols manager Malcolm McLaren paid them £5 for the gig but charged them £10 to use the PA system.

Track listing

Personnel
The Damned
Dave Vanian – vocals
Brian James – guitar
Captain Sensible – bass
Rat Scabies – drums

References

The Damned (band) albums
The Damned (band) live albums